The 16th National Geographic Bee was held in Washington, D.C. on May 26, 2004, sponsored by the National Geographic Society and ING. The final competition was moderated by Jeopardy! host Alex Trebek. The winner was Andrew Wojtanik of Kansas, who won a $25,000 college scholarship, lifetime membership in the National Geographic Society, and a trip to a Busch Gardens/Sea World Adventure Camp. The 2nd-place winner, Matthew Wells of Montana, won a $15,000 scholarship. The 3rd-place winner, Eric Liaw of Hawaii, won a $10,000 scholarship.

References

External links
 National Geographic Bee Official Website

National Geographic Bee